Melaleuca halophila is a plant in the myrtle family, Myrtaceae and is endemic to the south of Western Australia. It is a prickly shrub, similar to Melaleuca thapsina but its flowers are white and the leaves are shorter and hairier.

Description
The leaves are covered with short, soft hairs.

The flowers are white and arranged in heads on the ends of branches which continue to grow after flowering and in the upper leaf axils. There are five bundles of stamens around the flower, each with 3 to 7 stamens.

Taxonomy and naming
Melaleuca halophila was first formally described in 1999 by Lyndley Craven in Australian Systematic Botany from a specimen collected near Salmon Gums. The specific epithet (halophila) is derived from ancient Greek word meaning "salt" with the ending -philus meaning "loving", referring to the habitat of this species.

Distribution and habitat
Melaleuca halophila occurs in the Fitzgerald Peaks and Salmon Gums districts in the Esperance Plains and Mallee biogeographic regions.

Conservation status
Melaleuca halophila is listed as "not threatened" by the Government of Western Australia Department of Parks and Wildlife.

References

halophila
Plants described in 1999
Endemic flora of Western Australia
Taxa named by Lyndley Craven